Glyncorrwg is a village in the Afan Valley, in southern Wales.

Glyncorrwg is also the name of an electoral ward and formerly a community covering the village and surrounding countryside, in Neath Port Talbot county borough. Glyncorrwg community contains the villages of Abergwynfi, Blaengwynfi, Croeserw, Cymmer, Abercregan, Duffryn and Glyncorwg itself. The population of Glyncorrwg as a community, was recorded as 5,544 in the 2001 census, reducing to 5,283 at the 2011 census. The population of the electoral ward mentioned above was 1,096 only at the 2011 census.

History 
Glyncorrwg was once an important coal mining centre, typical of the South Wales Valleys. With the end of the coal mining industry during the 1970s, buildings were cleared away, factories closed and people left the area. 
In 1990 the local community decided to take advantage of the local scenery and complemented it with a series of ponds along the narrow valley. Trout fishing, coarse fishing, and canoeing are now popular sports in the area, plus miles of old flat railway trackbed lines and steep mountain slopes providing opportunities for cycling, hillwalking and mountain biking.

Glyncorrwg Health Centre
Dr Julian Tudor Hart established a famous research and teaching practice in Glyncorrwg.  He arrived in 1961 and conducted a series of epidemiological studies on the practice population - a population of about 1900 which was relatively stable and which he got to know well.  He established a health centre committee with a public health focus and demonstrated that systematic case-finding and regular follow-up  produced real benefits. In 1987 he found age-standardised death rates under 65 were 28% lower in Glyncorrwg than in nearby Blaengwynfi over the previous five-year period. This approach, which was the subject of many publications, led eventually to the introduction of the Quality and Outcomes Framework which rewarded GPs for meeting targets for intervention in the management of disease.

Glyncorrwg Coal Company
The South Wales Mineral Railway reached Glyncorrwg in 1863. It was always short of funds so was leased to the Glyncorrwg Coal Company, which became the Glyncorrwg Colliery Company Limited in 1870. This company operated a local coal mine and needed the railway to cheaply transport coal down to Briton Ferry.

Government and politics
The electoral ward of Glyncorrwg elects a county councillor to Neath Port Talbot County Borough Council and falls within the parliamentary constituency of Aberavon. The ward is surrounded by moorland which in turn is planted with coniferous forest. Glyncorrwg is bounded by the wards of Blaengwrach in the Vale of Neath to the North; Treherbert in the County of Rhondda Cynon Taff to the East; and to the South by Gwynfi and Cymmer in the (Afan Valley) and finally, by Resolven to the west.

In the 2012 local council elections, the electorate turnout for Glyncorrwg was 56.59%.  The results were:

In the 2017 local council elections, the results were:

In 2022 the community was abolished to form Gwynfi and Croeserw and Cymer and Glyncorrwg.

Pen y Cymoedd

In May 2012 it was announced that the Pen y Cymoedd windfarm, the highest-generating onshore wind farm in Wales, had received government backing, and that the 76 turbines would be operational by 2016. This was being developed by Swedish-based Vattenfall.

See also
Afan Forest Park

References
 
 Neath and Port Talbot Planning Application P / 2007 / 607 Available at npt.gov.uk/downloads/planning/pa_20070514.rtf

Notes

External links
St. John The Baptist Church, Glyncorrwg
www.geograph.co.uk : photos of Glyncorrwg and surrounding area
Boundaries of the community of Glyncorrwg

Villages in Neath Port Talbot
Electoral wards of Neath Port Talbot
Former communities in Neath Port Talbot
Afan Valley